The 2012–13 Florida A&M Rattlers basketball team represented Florida A&M University during the 2012–13 NCAA Division I men's basketball season. The Rattlers, led by second year head coach Clemon Johnson, played their home games at the Teaching Gym and were members of the Mid-Eastern Athletic Conference. They finish the season 8–23, 5–11 in MEAC play to finish in a tie for ninth place. They lost in the first round of the MEAC tournament to North Carolina A&T.

Roster

Schedule

|-
!colspan=9| Exhibition

|-
!colspan=9| Regular season

|-
!colspan=9| 2013 MEAC men's basketball tournament

References

Florida A&M Rattlers basketball seasons
Florida A and M
Florida AandM Rattlers basketball
Florida AandM Rattlers basketball